William Woodward (fl. 1388), from Dunwich, Suffolk, was an English Member of Parliament.

He was a Member (MP) of the Parliament of England for Dunwich in 1388.

References

14th-century births
Year of death missing
14th-century English people
People from Suffolk
Members of the Parliament of England (pre-1707)